Local elections were held in Pasay on May 11, 1992 within the Philippine general election. The voters elected for the elective local posts in the city: the mayor, vice mayor, the representative for the lone district, and the councilors, six of them in the two districts of the city.

Team Cuneta-Trinidad

Team Calixto-Monsod-Claudio

Background 
Mayor Pablo Cuneta ran for re-election. He was challenged by Rolando Briones and former Vice Mayor Eduardo "Duay" Calixto.

Vice Mayor Ibarra Cruz ran for re-election. He was challenged by former Vice Mayor Wenceslao Trinidad.

Representative Lorna Verano-Yap won't ran for re-election. Running in her place is former Mayor Jovito Claudio and Edgardo Cuneta, son of Mayor Pablo Cuneta.

Results

For Representative, Lone District 
Former Mayor Jovito Claudio won over Edgardo Cuneta, son of Mayor Pablo Cuneta.

For Mayor 
Mayor Pablo Cuneta defeated Rolando "Ding" Briones and former OIC-Mayor Eduardo "Duay" Calixto in mayoral race.

For Vice Mayor 
Vice Mayor Ibarra Cruz was defeated by former Councilor and defeated 1988 mayoral candidate Wenceslao Trinidad.

For Councilors 
Reference: 

|-bgcolor=black
|colspan=5|

Pasay
Elections in Pasay